Chad Mureta is an app mogul, blockchain gaming investor/advisor, author, speaker, investor and serial entrepreneur. Since 2009, Mureta has led the development, marketing and monetization of more than 115 apps including the first "Emoji" iOS app that has been downloaded worldwide more than 155 million times. Chad is also the Co-Founder of Project EVO which helps entrepreneurs and professionals find their flow by uncovering who they are and what they do best.

Early life
Mureta attended Coastal Carolina University and graduated in 2003 with a B.A. in Business Management. After graduating, Mureta owned a newspaper company and worked as a real estate investor. In 2006, Mureta started his own real estate agency in Myrtle Beach, South Carolina. During the height of the housing market crash, he often worked 18-hour days.

In January 2009, Mureta drove home from a basketball game when he hit a deer, which caused his car to flip four times. The accident crushed and nearly severed his left arm. He underwent two major operations and spent 18 months recovering, accruing nearly $100,000 in hospital bills. While in the hospital, a friend gave Mureta a newspaper article about app millionaires.

Career
After he was released from the hospital, Mureta borrowed $1,800 from his stepfather to start his app business. He used the money to create his first app, "Fingerprint Security-Pro," which mimics fingerprint-scanning technology. Fingerprint Security-Pro became a bestseller in the App Store, peaking at number 27 in the App Store in 2011, and netting more than $500,000 in revenue.

After "Fingerprint Security-Pro," Mureta went on to create over 50 apps that have been downloaded more than 150 million times worldwide.

In 2012 he wrote the book App Empire: Make Money, Have a Life, and Let Technology Work for You, which was released by John Wiley & Son. It chronicles Mureta's transformation from real estate agent to appreneur and provides a non-technical guide to starting a mobile app business.

During a BBC interview in October 2015, Mureta revisited his near death experience and his company, App Empire, which brings in $3m to $5m in revenue every year.

In February 2018, Project EVO launched an Indiegogo campaign, which reached $1 million in funds on November 18, 2018, and is still growing.

Over the years, Chad's success formula has allowed him to build up and sell 8 app companies.

Television 
In July 2012, Mureta was featured on 60 Minutes. In the interview titled "The App Revolution", Mureta said, "This is just the beginning, and I think a lot of people are just getting that this is a real business. This is a real industry and really there's not a lot of barrier to entry to get into it. Anybody can. The thing is, I am just like everybody else. There's no difference. I mean yes, I've been successful, I'm not the smartest person in the world, and I've never had any tech experience."

Mureta was interviewed by Tony Robbins in a special titled, "How To Create An App Empire".

Philosophy
Mureta believes in understanding the marketplace to come up with app ideas then outsourcing the actual programming. Another one of his apps is Emoji, Mureta created this app in two weeks. Within six days of release, it was averaging $500 per day and was No. 1 on the App Store's productivity category and No. 12 in the top free overall category.

Mureta does most of his business from his iPhone, including managing his employees, looking at his apps' daily stats and rankings, and surveying the app market. He has used the app business as a means to work less and to use more time to travel.

Mureta began his app business without experience in the app or technology fields. He has since founded and served as CEO of Empire Apps and co-founded T3 Apps and Best Apps.

References

Year of birth missing (living people)
Living people
American company founders
Coastal Carolina University alumni
American male writers
People from Myrtle Beach, South Carolina